Saldus Municipality (2009–2021) was a municipality in Courland, Latvia. The municipality was formed in 2009 by merging Saldus town, Ezere Parish, Jaunauce Parish, Jaunlutriņi Parish, Kursīši Parish, Lutriņi Parish, Nīgrande Parish, Novadnieki Parish, Pampāļi Parish, Ruba Parish, Saldus Parish, Šķēde Parish, Vadakste Parish, Zaņa Parish, Zirņi Parish and Zvārde Parish, the administrative centre being Saldus. On July 1, 2021 the municipality was merged with Brocēni Municipality. The population in 2020 was 21,587.

Population

Patron of the University of Latvia 
Saldus municipality was a silver patron of the University of Latvia Foundation. Supported the University of Latvia in 2013-2019, when it established a scholarship “Medusmaize”, which is intended for young people of their region who, after graduating from high school, start basic studies in one of the Latvian universities. If the criteria are met, support is provided throughout the bachelor's degree.

Twin towns — sister cities

Saldus is twinned with:

 Mažeikiai, Lithuania
 Nevarėnai, Lithuania
 Šilutė, Lithuania
 Paide, Estonia
 Stargard, Poland
 Florești, Moldova
 Lidingö, Sweden
 Liederbach am Taunus, Germany
 Sankt Andrä, Austria
 Sergiyev Posad, Russia
 Tsqaltubo, Georgia
 Villebon-sur-Yvette, France
 Volda, Norway

See also
Administrative divisions of Latvia

References

 
Former municipalities of Latvia